Sumo is a form of wrestling.

Sumo may also refer to:

People
 Sumo (people), a people of Central America
 Sumo language (disambiguation)

Science
 Suggested Upper Merged Ontology, a foundation ontology for a variety of computer information processing systems
 SUMO protein, small ubiquitin-like modifier

Arts and entertainment
 Sumo, a character on Clarence (2014 TV series)
 SuMo, abbreviation for the Pokémon Sun and Moon video games
 Sumo (album), an album by The Superjesus
 Sumo (band), an Argentinian band
 Sumo (book), a book by Helmut Newton
 Sumo (comics), a Marvel Comics character
 Sumo Digital, a developer of video games
 Sumo (video games), a genre of games based on the sport
 Sumo (film), an Indian film

Software
 Simulation of Urban MObility (SUMO), an open-source traffic simulator
 Sumo, a digital creative toolbox that includes Sumopaint 2.0, Sumotunes, Sumocode, Sumo3d, Sumovideo, and Sumophoto as of June 2020.

Transportation
 Supermoto, a style of motorcycle
 Tata Sumo, a 4x4 sport-utility vehicle

Other uses
 Sumo citrus, a marketing name for the Dekopon mandarin in the United States.